Dennis Murphy (born 1946 or 1947) is an American television journalist and winner of four national Emmys for excellence in news reporting, known for regular contributions to NBC News, NBC Nightly News, Dateline NBC, The Today Show and NBC News at Sunrise.

Personal life
Murphy graduated from the Georgetown Preparatory School in Maryland in 1965 and from Williams College in Massachusetts 1969.  He and his wife, Marilyn, live in Florida.

Career
Dennis J. Murphy has covered stories for NBC News from more than 50 countries. As a regular contributor to NBC Nightly News with Tom Brokaw and Today, his assignments have given him a front-row seat for some of the biggest stories of the last two decades—from wars in the Persian Gulf and Central America to the collapse of the Soviet Empire and the Berlin Wall, and most recently, the war on terror in Afghanistan.

Early career
Before joining NBC News, Murphy was a reporter for KING-TV, the NBC affiliate in Seattle, Washington. He began his career as a desk assistant at WCBS-TV in New York and worked for several years as an assignment editor, producer and reporter at KHOU-TV in Houston, Texas.

NBC News
Murphy began his career as an NBC News correspondent in 1982 at the Burbank bureau. The following year he was assigned to Miami from where he traveled extensively throughout South and Central America. The invasion of Grenada, civil war in Nicaragua and El Salvador, a deadly volcanic eruption in Colombia and drug lords were all part of his watch in the 1980s. In 1988 he covered the Democratic presidential primaries and was NBC's traveling correspondent on the Bush campaign.

Dateline NBC
Since May 1994, Murphy has been a correspondent with Dateline NBC. In 2000, he received an Edward R. Murrow Award for a report on Hurricane Floyd and a Clarion award for a spot news story on the Oklahoma City bombing. In 1999, he was awarded an Emmy Award, Clarion Award, Harry Chapin Media Award and a National Headliner Award for "Children of the Harvest," the story about children in the U.S. working as migrant laborers on farms.  In addition, he received a Clarion Award for his work on "A Few Good Men," the story of several men from one marine unit who fought together in Vietnam. Murphy has also received a National Association of Black Journalists Award for International Reporting. In 1996, he was honored with two Emmys for his work on Dateline and an American Bar Association certificate of merit for an hour-long Dateline program on the anatomy of a civil trial.

NBC Foreign Correspondent
Before Dateline, Murphy was posted in NBC's London bureau as chief foreign correspondent for Today where his stories took him literally around the world: Japan, Thailand, India, Africa, the Middle-East and Europe. His major assignments included the revolutions of Eastern Europe in 1989, German unification, the last days of Margaret Thatcher, funerals of the Ayatollah and Emperor Hirohito. Murphy was a frequent visitor to Moscow in the turbulent times when McDonald's and Gorbachev arrived and 75 years of an old order left. He was at the Berlin Wall the night the first West Berliner climbed it in defiance of border guards below. Murphy also covered the plight of the Kurds in Iraq following the Gulf War and reported in the early 1990s from hot spots such as Baghdad, Bosnia and Mogadishu. He won his first Emmy for a report on revolution in Romania in 1989.

Awards
In addition to his four Emmys, Murphy has won two San Francisco State media awards, an EDI from the Easter Seals Foundation and the Margaret Sanger Award for a Dateline report on late-term abortions. He also received the first place Headliners Award for an hour report on the Cunanan/Versace murder. Murphy has received two Edward R. Murrow Awards, two Clarion Awards and a Gracie honorable mention.

References

External links
 

American television reporters and correspondents
Emmy Award winners
Williams College alumni
Living people
Year of birth missing (living people)
Georgetown Preparatory School alumni